Morinus may refer to:

Jean-Baptiste Morin (mathematician), French mathematician and astrologer
Jean Morin (theologian) (1591–1659), French theologian
Petrus Morinus (1531–1608), French biblical scholar